Paul  William Miller (January 23, 1913 – June 2, 1992) was a halfback in the National Football League. He played with the Green Bay Packers for three seasons.

College career 
Miller attended South Dakota State, where he played football and track, lettering in football 1933-1935 and track 1934-1936. He was captain of his college team. In 1934, he was the nation's third highest point maker with 19 touchdowns during one season. In 1935, Miller played the most notable game of his college career when South Dakota State upset University of Wisconsin 13-6. The Jackrabbits clinched the game in the last two minutes when Miller intercepted a pass and dashed 75 yards for a touchdown.

Professional career 

Earl "Curly" Lambeau wrote Miller a letter pointing out how well the shifts and plays he learned at South Dakota State would fit into the Packer game. In Miller's rookie season, the Packers won their fourth World Championship. Miller played for the Packers from 1936–1938.

References

External links
South Dakota State Athletics 1930's Wall of Fame
WORLD CHAMPIONS The 1936 Green Bay Packers

1913 births
1992 deaths
American football halfbacks
South Dakota State Jackrabbits football players
Green Bay Packers players
Players of American football from South Dakota
People from Platte, South Dakota